Kion Smith (born October 7, 1998) is an American football offensive tackle for the Miami Dolphins of the National Football League (NFL). He played college football at Fayetteville State.

Early life and education
Smith played high school football at Lumberton High School. He was out for his entire senior season due to an injury.

Smith was at Fayetteville State University for his collegiate career. He played in 20 total games while he was there. His senior season was cancelled entirely due to the COVID-19 pandemic.

Professional career

Atlanta Falcons
After going undrafted in the 2021 NFL Draft, Smith signed a contract with the Atlanta Falcons. However, he was not on the final 53-man roster.

Miami Dolphins
On September 6, 2021, Smith joined the Miami Dolphins practice squad. He signed a reserve/future contract with the Dolphins on January 11, 2022. He was waived on August 30, 2022 and re-signed to the practice squad. He signed a reserve/future contract on January 16, 2023.

References

External links
 Miami Dolphins bio
 Fayetteville State University Broncos bio

Further reading

1998 births
Living people
American football offensive tackles
Miami Dolphins players
African-American players of American football
21st-century African-American sportspeople
Fayetteville State Broncos football players